Luke Crosbie (born 22 April 1997) is a Scotland international rugby union player. He plays for Edinburgh Rugby in the United Rugby Championship.

Rugby Union career

Amateur career

He is a product of Livingston RFC, Crosbie rose through the ranks of the West Lothian side before an opportunity arose at the capital outfit, Currie RFC.

Professional career

He made his debut for Edinburgh off the bench against the Italian outfit Zebre coming on for Cornell du Preez in 64th minute.

In December 2017 after impressing with a physical and abrasive style of style of play allied with a rare turn of pace for a player of his stature, Crosbie signed his first professional deal with the club which will keep him at Edinburgh for at least the next two-and-a-half years.

International career

He was called up to Scotland's squad for the 2019 Six Nations Championship. He was called up again to the 2020 Six Nations Championship squad.

He made his Scotland debut against Tonga on 30 October 2021. Scotland won the match 60-14.

He captained a Scotland 'A' side against Chile on 25 June 2022 in Santiago.

References

External links
 
Scottish Rugby - Luke Crosbie

1997 births
Living people
Scottish rugby union players
Edinburgh Rugby players
Rugby union players from Livingston, West Lothian
Scotland international rugby union players
Rugby union flankers